The Leica Q (Type 116) is a full-frame fixed-lens camera announced by Leica on June 10, 2015. The Leica Q2 was announced in March 2019.

Leica Q

Specifications
Lens: Leica Summilux 28 mm f/1.7 ASPH.; 11 elements in 9 groups, 3 aspherical elements
Aperture range: f/1.7 - f/16 in 1/3 EV increments 
Digital zoom values: 1.25x or 1.8x crop modes (35 and 50mm eq.) 
Autofocus type: Contrast-detect AF: Single zone (adjustable), multi-field (49 zones), face recognition, subject tracking, optional setting/shutter release by touching the monitor; Manual focus with focus peaking and magnification available
Viewfinder: EVF: 3.68M-dot eq. LCoS, 100% coverage, 4:3 aspect ratio, +/-3 diopter, eye sensor

Leica Q-P
The Leica Q-P was announced on 6 November 2018. The Q-P is an update to the original Q but without the Leica's red dot, instead it has the Leica script on the top. The features and technical specifications are similar to the Q, except for a quieter shutter and an improved on/off switch.

References

External links
  Leica Q user report, review and sample photos by Thorsten Overgaard

Full-frame mirrorless fixed-lens cameras
Q
Cameras introduced in 2015